Saint Bassus of Lucera (c 40/50–118) was a Christian martyr and saint, and traditionally the first bishop of Lucera in Apulia, Italy. He is the patron saint of Termoli.

Legend 
One of the earliest Christian communities is believed to have been established in Lucera. The legend of the saint relates that in about the year 60 Saint Peter passed through and put Bassus at the head of the nascent bishopric. Bassus was martyred under Trajan in 118.

His feast day is 5 December.

Disagreements on identity 
There is some controversy regarding the identity of Bassus, in that there is potential confusion between Saint Bassus of Lucera and Saint Bassus of Nice (or Nicaea), who was also a bishop and martyr and whose feast day also falls on 5 December, although his martyrdom took place at Nice in about 250. There may also be confusion with a certain Saint Dasius of Dorostoro, also known as Bassus.

Notes

Sources
Santi, Beati e Testimoni: San Basso di Nizza 
San Basso di Termoli historical website 
Folklore of Termoli 
Cupra Marittima: San Basso 

Saints from Roman Italy
118 deaths
Year of birth unknown